The 2020 4. deild karla season was the 8th since its establishment. A total of 29 teams, were split into four groups of 7 or 8 teams based on a regional basis. The top two from each group will progress to the second phase of the campaign. 

The season started on 16 June.

League table

Group A

Group B

Group C

Group D

Second phase
The top two from each group will enter this phase of the campaign.

References 

Iceland
Iceland
5